Dvir is a kibbutz in southern Israel.
'Dvir may also refer to:

, now part of Kinneret Zmora-Bitan Dvir
Debir (disambiguation)
Dvir (name)

See also